Frederick George Ackerley  (1871–1954) was an Anglican priest in the Church of England, at different times the Archdeacon of Bradford then Craven. He was also an acknowledged scholar of Romany language and culture.

Ackerley was educated at Rossall School and Jesus College, Oxford and ordained in 1898. He served curacies in Keighley, Eccles, and Washington and incumbencies at Grindleton, Great Mitton and Carleton-in-Craven. Later he was Rural Dean of Bolland before his years as an Archdeacon.

References

1871 births
People educated at Rossall School
Alumni of Jesus College, Oxford
Archdeacons of Bradford
Archdeacons of Craven
1954 deaths